Javan Etienne (born 22 August 1962) is a Dominican cricketer. He played in twenty-eight first-class and six List A matches for the Windward Islands from 1983 to 1990.

See also
 List of Windward Islands first-class cricketers

References

External links
 

1962 births
Living people
Dominica cricketers
Windward Islands cricketers